"Courtin' in the Rain" is a song written and sung by T. Texas Tyler and released on the 4 Star label (catalog no. 1660). In July 1954, it peaked at No. 3 on the Billboard country and western chart. It was also ranked No. 12 on Billboards 1954 year-end country and western juke box chart.

See also
 Billboard Top Country & Western Records of 1954

References

T. Texas Tyler songs
1954 songs